Yaviza is a town and corregimiento in Pinogana District, Darién Province, Panama with a population of 4,441 as of 2010.

Location
The town marks the southeastern end of the northern half of the Pan-American Highway, at the north end of the Darién Gap.Leonard, Thomas M. Historical Dictionary of Panama, p. xxxv (2015)  It lies on the Chucunaque River, a major tributary of the Tuira River, along which travel by boat into the Darién Gap occurs.  The nearest town on the river route is El Real de Santa María, which is the capital of Pinogana District.

Demographics
The population of Yaviza as of 1990 was 8,452, falling to 3,317 as recorded in the year 2000, and rising to 4,441 as of 2010.

History
The town was founded by Spanish missionaries as  San Jerónimo de Yaviza in September 1638.  A Spanish fort (Fuerte de San Geronimo de Yaviza) was built in 1760, and heavily damaged by an attack of the Indigenous Guna in 1780.  A flood destroyed half of the remaining ruins in the mid-20th century.  

As the Pan-American Highway was constructed, it eventually reached Yaviza as a dirt road.  But plans to complete the road to Colombia were stopped, leaving Yaviza as the end point of the northern half of the highway.  The final sections of the highway to Yaviza have since been improved and are now paved.

References

Corregimientos of Darién Province
Populated places in Darién Province
Populated places established in 1638